Coláiste Chraobh Abhann [English: The College of a Branch over a River] is a community secondary school situated in Kilcoole, County Wicklow, Ireland. It is owned and run by the Kildare and Wicklow Education and Training Board. It was built in 2003 and reached its capacity of 560 students in 2009.

Students at the school sit the Junior Certificate syllabus for their first three years at the school, and the Leaving Certificate syllabus for their last two, with the option of Transition Year between.

References

External links
 http://www.colaisteca.ie/

Secondary schools in County Wicklow
2003 establishments in Ireland
Educational institutions established in 2003